The Precarious Bank Teller is a 1980 Italian comedy film directed by Luciano Salce.

Plot 
Arturo De Fanti is an accountant with business troubles who tries to help his economically straitened lover by introducing her (in disguise) into the home he shares with his wife. The deception does not succeed.

Cast 
Paolo Villaggio as Accountant Arturo De Fanti
Catherine Spaak as Elena
Anna Maria Rizzoli as Vanna
Gigi Reder as  Willy
Anna Mazzamauro as Selvaggia
Carlo Giuffré as  Libero Catena
Vincenzo Crocitti as  Ciuffini
Enrica Bonaccorti as Smeralda
Ugo Bologna as Morpurgo

See also    
 List of Italian films of 1980

References

External links

1980 films
Italian comedy films
1980 comedy films
Films directed by Luciano Salce
Adultery in films
Films set in Rome
Films shot in Rome
Films scored by Piero Piccioni
1980s Italian-language films
1980s Italian films